Ismael Bolívar Fernández (born 8 February 1989) is a Spanish retired footballer who plays for CD Pozoblanco as a defender.

Club career
Born in Córdoba, Andalusia, Bolívar made his senior debuts with CD Villanueva in the 2008–09 season, in Tercera División. He first arrived in Segunda División B in 2010, signing with Lucena CF.

On 13 July 2010 Bolívar moved to Córdoba CF, initially being assigned to the reserves in the fourth division. On 4 November 2011 he played his first game as a professional, coming on as a late substitute in a 1–1 home draw against FC Barcelona B in the Segunda División championship.

On 13 July 2012 Bolívar was loaned to CD Guijuelo, in the third level. Roughly a year later he returned to Lucena, on a permanent basis.

References

External links

1989 births
Living people
Footballers from Córdoba, Spain
Spanish footballers
Association football defenders
Segunda División players
Segunda División B players
Tercera División players
Córdoba CF B players
Córdoba CF players
CD Guijuelo footballers
Lucena CF players
Écija Balompié players